Dando is a town in Tando Muhammad Khan District, Sindh province, Pakistan.

Dando consists of one union council. The town has a population of around 3,943, speaking Urdu, Sindhi and Gujarati languages. Majority of people are sindhi speaking Memons. Historical mosque of BiBi Lal masjid is located here. Tomb of Sajan sawahi is beside Dando, it has one of the oldest railway station Pal station. Gooni (new phuleli) provides water for irrigation and household use. Cotton, rice paddy, tomato and sugarcane are key crops of Dando.

References

Populated places in Tando Muhammad Khan District